Ameur is a surname. Notable persons with the surname include:
 Mammar Ameur, imprisoned by the United States in the Guantanamo Bay Naval Base, Cuba
 Hameur Hizem or Ameur Hizem (born 1937), Tunisian former football manager
 Hamoud Ameur, French athlete who competed in the Men's 5000 metres at the 1960 Summer Olympics

See also
 Ameur Aviation, an aircraft manufacturer
 Ameur, Morocco, a suburb of Salé in Morocco